Milan Radin (born 25 June 1991) is a Serbian professional footballer who plays as a defensive midfielder for Dinamo Batumi.

Club career
Born in Novi Sad, Radin grew up in Mošorin, where he started playing football at the local club Miletić. Later he played with Borac Šajkaš and finally with RFK Novi Sad, where he completed his youth categories. He signed a three-year scholarship deal with the club, before being loaned to Jugović Kać in the 2009–10 season, scoring eight league goals. Subsequently, Radin went on a trial with Smederevo, before eventually joining Senta. He spent two seasons at the club, before switching to Radnički Nova Pazova. In 2014 winter transfer window, Radin signed with Mladost Lučani, helping them win promotion to the top flight of Serbian football. He was suspended by the club after refusing to renew his contract in August 2015. His contract was finally terminated in December 2015. In early 2016, Radin spent some time on trial with Russian club Arsenal Tula, but no deal was concluded. He eventually joined Voždovac shortly after.

On 4 June 2016, Radin signed a three-year contract with Partizan, choosing the number 29 shirt. On 29 October 2016, Radin made his competitive debut for Partizan, playing as a right back in a 3–1 away victory over Radnik Surdulica He collected 12 games and won the double in his debut season in Partizan. Radin played full both matches in play-off round for 2017–18 UEFA Europa League and helped club to reach group stage of the Europa League by beating Videoton. He played full match against Dynamo Kyiv in second match of the group stage, on 28 September 2017.

On 27 February 2018, it was announced Radin moved to the Kazakhstan Premier League side Aktobe as a free agent, extending his contract for the 2019 season on 25 January 2019. However, he signed with Polish club Korona Kielce on 26 June 2019. He penned a two-year contract.

On 23 January 2021, he signed a one-year contract with Dinamo Tbilisi.

Career statistics

Club

Honours
Mladost Lučani
 Serbian First League: 2013–14

Partizan
 Serbian SuperLiga: 2016–17
 Serbian Cup: 2016–17

References

External links
 Milan Radin stats at utakmica.rs 
 
 
 
 
 

1991 births
Living people
Serbian footballers
Footballers from Novi Sad
Serbia international footballers
Association football midfielders
FC Aktobe players
FK Mladost Lučani players
FK Partizan players
FK Radnički Nova Pazova players
FK Senta players
FK Voždovac players
Korona Kielce players
FK Inđija players
FC Dinamo Tbilisi players
FC Dinamo Batumi players
Kazakhstan Premier League players
Serbian First League players
Ekstraklasa players
Serbian SuperLiga players
Erovnuli Liga players
Serbian expatriate footballers
Expatriate footballers in Kazakhstan
Serbian expatriate sportspeople in Kazakhstan
Expatriate footballers in Poland
Serbian expatriate sportspeople in Poland
Serbian expatriate sportspeople in Georgia (country)
Expatriate footballers in Georgia (country)